Luke Jones may refer to:

Luke Jones (footballer) (born 1987), English footballer
 Luke Jones (rugby union) (born 1991), Australian rugby union footballer
 Luke Jones (motorcyclist) (born 1989), British motorcycle racer
 Luke Jones (squash player) (born 1997), New Zealand squash player